B.U.G. Mafia prezintă CASA (B.U.G. Mafia presents CASA) is a compilation album by B.U.G. Mafia. It was released in 2002 and was the first release on their then newly established Casa Productions. Featured on the album is a bevy of acts who were among the earliest to sign to Casa Productions, many of whom quickly became disassociated with the label without seeing their own projects come to fruition. B.U.G. Mafia perform just two tracks: "Cine E Cu Noi" (Who's With Us), a collaboration with Romanian soul singer Nicoleta "Nico" Matei that was released as the first single and became the disc's most noted, and "Toți Borfașii" (All The Thugs).

B.U.G. Mafia are only sparsely heard on the album, performing just two tracks, which became the disc's most noted. Another one of the album's stand-out moments is the Tataee-produced track, "O Vorbă de pe Stradă" (A Word from the Street), performed by Mahsat, XXL & 10 Grei and Villy. The track was an answer to, and snubbed, the existing critical reaction to Romanian hip hop. For Tataee as a producer, the album was the last in which he used a 1990s Public Enemy and N.W.A-influenced production style, sampling drum breaks and making use of heavily synthesized sounds.

Track listing

References

External links
 B.U.G. Mafia prezintă CASA at Discogs

B.U.G. Mafia albums
Hip hop compilation albums
2003 compilation albums